Bres was a mythic Irish king of the Tuatha Dé Danann. Bres may also refer to:

Bres Rí, legendary Irish High King
Guido de Bres (1522–1567), Walloon pastor, Protestant reformer and theologian
Klaudia Breś (born 1994), Polish sport shooter
Madeleine Brès (1842–1921), first French woman to obtain a medical degree
Małgorzata Breś (born 1959), Polish fencer
Bres., taxonomic author abbreviation of Giacomo Bresadola (1847–1929), Italian mycologist

See also
Saint-Brès (disambiguation), name or part of the name of several communes in France
Brees (surname)
Bress, a surname